Adv. Prathibha  is an Indian politician and the current Member of the Legislative Assembly (M.L.A.) representing the Kayamkulam constituency of Alappuzha district, Kerala. She was Alappuzha District Panchayat President during the term of 2010–2015 and President of Thakazhy Grama Panchayat during 2005–2010. She was born in Thakazhy village of Alapuzha District.

Personal Details 
Daughter of Sri. V. K. Purushothaman and Smt. J. Umayamma. Born at Thakazhy on 10 May 1977. She has done B.A. LLB.

Politics 
She was elected as a member in Thakazhy Grama Panchayat in 2000-2005. She became the President of Thakazhy Grama Panchayat during 2005- 2010. She was the President of Alapuzhha District panchayat from 2010- 2015. She was elected to 14th Legislative assembly and 15th Legislative assembly of Kerala from Kayamkulam Constituency.

In 2016 Kerala Legislative Assembly Election, she defeated Adv. M. Liju of INC, with a majority of 11857 votes and in 2021 Kerala Legislative Assembly election, she won against Aritha Babu of INC with a majority of 6298.

References

Living people
1977 births
Kerala politicians
Communist Party of India (Marxist) politicians from Kerala